A mining community, also known as a mining town or a mining camp, is a community that houses miners. Mining communities are usually created around a mine or a quarry.

Historical mining communities

Australia 
 Ballarat, Victoria
 Bendigo, Victoria
 Kalgoorlie, Western Australia
 Menzies, Western Australia

Austria 
 Schwaz
 Eisenerz, Styria

Austria-Hungary 
Upper Austrio-Hungarian mining towns
Göllnitz, today Gelnica
Jossau, today Jasov
Nemecká Ľupča, today Partizánska Ľupča
Schmöllnitz, today Smolník
Rosenau, today Rožňava
Ruda, today Rudabánya in Hungary
Telken, today Telkibánya in Hungary
Zipser Neudorf, today Spišská Nová Ves

Lower Austrio-Hungarian mining towns
Dilln, today Banská Belá
Königsberg, today Nová Baňa
Kremnitz, today Kremnica
Libethen, today Ľubietová
Neusohl, today Banská Bystrica
Pukanz, today Pukanec
Schemnitz, today Banská Štiavnica

Bosnia and Herzegovina 
Banovići
Kakanj
Tuzla
Zenica

Canada 
Cobalt, Ontario
Glace Bay, Nova Scotia
Dawson City, Yukon
Lynn Lake, Manitoba
Red Lake, Ontario
Thompson, Manitoba
Timmins, Ontario

Czechia 
(Listed under names given when founded or working as a mining town)

Abertham, today Abertamy
Adamstadt, today Adamov
Adamsfreiheit, today Hůrky
Bärringen, today Pernink
Bergreichenstein, today Kašperské Hory
Bergstadt, today Horní Město
Bleistadt, today Oloví
Böhmisch Wiesenthal, today Loučná pod Klínovcem
Eule, today Jílové u Prahy
St. Georgenthal, today Jiretin pod Jedlovou
Goldeck (Mährisch Altstadt), today Staré Město pod Sněžníkem
Goldenstein, today Branná
Gossengrün, today Krajková
Gottesgab, today Boží Dar
Graupen, today Krupka
Hartmanitz, today Hartmanice
Iglau, today Jihlava
St. Joachimsthal, today Jáchymov
Johannesthal, today Janov
St. Katharinaberg, today Hora Svaté Kateriny
Klostergrab, today Hrob
Kupferberg, today Měděnec
Kuttenberg, today Kutná Hora
Lauterbach (Kaiserwald) (town no longer exists)
Mies, today Stříbro
Neustadt a. d. Tafelfichte, today Nové Město pod Smrkem
Plan, today Planá
Platz, today Místo
Platten, today Horní Blatná
Preßnitz (town no longer exists)
Rudolfstadt, today Rudolfov
Schlaggenwald, today Horní Slavkov
Sebastiansberg, today Hora Svatého Šebestiána
Sonnenberg, today Výsluní
Unterreichenstein, today Rejštejn
Wodnian, today Vodňany
Zuckmantel, today Zlaté Hory

Finland
Pargas

Germany 
In Germany, a Bergstadt refers to a settlement near mineral deposits vested with town privileges, Bergregal rights and tax exemption, in order to promote the economic development of the mining region.

Baden-Württemberg 
Freudenstadt
Prinzbach

Bavaria 
Auerbach in der Oberpfalz
Pegnitz (town)
Bodenmais
Lam
Fichtelberg (Upper Franconia)

Lower Saxony 
Altenau
Bad Grund
Clausthal
Zellerfeld
Lautenthal
Obernkirchen
Sankt Andreasberg
Wildemann

North Rhine-Westphalia 
Lüdenscheid

Saxony 
Altenberg
Annaberg
Buchholz
Berggießhübel
Bleiberg (near Frankenberg/Sa.) (town no longer exists)
Brand
Ehrenfriedersdorf
Eibenstock
Elterlein
Ernstthal
Freiberg
Geyer
Glashütte (Saxony)
Hohenstein
Johanngeorgenstadt
Lengefeld
Lößnitz
Marienberg, Saxony
Neustädtel
Oberwiesenthal
Oederan
Scheibenberg
Schneeberg
Schwarzenberg/Erzgeb.
Thum
Voigtsberg
Wolkenstein
Zschopau
Zwönitz

Saxony-Anhalt 
Eisleben
Sangerhausen

Thuringia 
Ilmenau
Ruhla
Suhl
Sondershausen

Hong Kong 
  Ma On Shan Village

Indonesia 
 Central Papua Province 
 Tembagapura

Nigeria 
Enugu
Jos

Norway 
Kongsberg (formerly)
Røros

Poland 
Georgenberg (now Miasteczko Śląskie)
Goldberg, (now Złotoryja)
Groß Salze, (now Wieliczka)
Nikolstadt, (now Mikołajowice)
Salzberg, (now Bochnia)
Wilhelmstal, (now Bolesławów)

Slovenia 
 Idrija
 Velenje
 Trbovlje

South Korea 
 Gangwon Province
 Jeongseon County
 Taebaek City
 Samcheok City
 Yeongwol County
 North Gyeongsang Province
 Sangju City
 Mungyeong City
 Uljin County
  Yeongju City
 Bonghwa County

United States

Alaska
Juneau
Skagway

Arizona
Bisbee
Cerro Colorado
Contention City
Jerome
Klondyke
Ruby
Tombstone
Tumacacori

California
Calico, San Bernardino Co.
Columbia

Colorado
Central City
Cripple Creek
Denver
Idaho Springs
Leadville
Tercio
Victor

Idaho
Custer
Idaho City

Iowa
Buxton
Centerville
Coalville
Confidence
Lucas
Everist
Muchakinock
Mystic
Numa
Seymour
What Cheer

Michigan
Bessemer
Calumet
Houghton
Ironwood
Ishpeming
Negaunee
Wakefield
White Pine

Minnesota
Aurora
Babbitt
Biwabik
Bovey
Buhl
Calumet
Chisholm
Coleraine
Crosby
Cuyuna
Ely
Eveleth
Gilbert
Hibbing
Hoyt Lakes
Ironton
Keewatin
Kinney
Marble
McKinley
Mountain Iron
Nashwauk
Riverton
Soudan
Taconite
Trommald
Virginia

Montana
Bannack (ghost town)
Butte
Colstrip
Virginia City

Nevada
Austin
Eureka
Goldfield
Jarbidge
Pioche
Tonopah
Virginia City

New Mexico
Pinos Altos
Silver City

South Dakota
Deadwood

Utah
Dragon
Eureka
Frisco
Park City
Silver Reef
Spring Canyon

Wisconsin
Hurley

See also
Boomtown
Coal town
Man camp  temporary housing for resource extraction
Mission (station)
Pit village

References

Citations 
  Book features pg. 147 about what is necessary for a settlement to have in order to be considered a "mining town".

 
History of mining